Mohamed Saad Abdel-Hamid Ibrahim (born 14 December 1968) is an Egyptian film actor and comedian, active since 1988. Saad known for comedic roles.

Saad started his career acting several supporting roles, his first breakthrough was opposite Salah Zulfikar in Road To Eilat (1994). His second role that brought him fame was in El Nazer (2000). Then Saad took the lead in El-Limby (2002; the name, that of Saad's character, is a play on the name of one of Egypt's colonial figures, High Commissioner Edmund Allenby). Playing the film's "illiterate, inefficient, slow, stoned and drunk" hero, Saad "invests his first leading role with a hyperactive physical energy, especially evident in dance sequences." The comedy film became one of the highest-grossing films in Egyptian cinema.

Between 2003 and 2005, Saad played similar characters in three further films, including one of his most successful movies Ely Baly Balak.

In 2006, Saad starred in Katkout (The Chick), in which he played a hopeless Upper Egyptian who stumbles into a career as a boxer and crimefighter. Cairo online magazine Yallabina criticized the film for relying on Saad's physical comedy at the expense of story and script.

Filmography

TV Series
 Ma zal alnayl yajri, Wa - 1992 (ar: وما زال النيل يجري) - And the Nile is still running; Bakati
 Ayam Almunira - 1994 (ar: أيام المنيرة) - Days of Almunira (district in Cairo); Zinger
 Qisat Madina - 1995 (ar: قصة مدينة) - A city story; Eliwa
 Beit El-Gamalyia - 1996 (ar: بيت الجمالية) - El-Jamalyia house
 Man aldhy la yuhibu Fatima, Wa - 1996 (ar: ومن الذي لا يحب فاطمة) - Who does not like Fatima?; Raafat
 Marfu' Muaqataan Min Alkhidma - 1997 (ar: مرفوع مؤقتا من الخدمة) - Temporarily out of service; Atiar
 Sharie Aljadid, Al - 1997 (ar: الشارع الجديد) - The new street; Negro
 Fawazir Tayatru - 1998 (ar: فوازير تياترو); Zezo
 Aiesar, Al - 1999 (ar: الإعصار) - The Cyclone
 Fawazir Aleial Atjananat - 1999 (ar: فوازير العيال اتجننت) - Fawazir Children went crazy; Adham
 Fajala, Al - 2000 (ar: الفجالة); Khalifa
 Shams Al Ansari - 2012 (ar: شمس الأنصاري); Shams Al Ansari / Saleh Abu Kenawy
 Viva Atata - 2014 (ar: فيفا أطاطا); Oukal / Atata

Films
 Alesh Dakhal El-Gesh - 1989 (ar: عليش دخل الجيش) - Alesh entered the army
 Tariq Ela Eilat, El  - 1994 (ar: الطريق إلى إيلات) - The Road to Eilat; Kenawy
 Gentle, El - 1996 (ar: الجنتل) - The Gentle; Youssef El-Mahrapy Ghorab
 Emra' wa khams Rijal - 1997 (ar: امرأه وخمس رجال) - A woman and five men; Sherif
 Nazer, El - 1999 (ar: الناظر) - The Principal; El-Limby
 55 Esaaf - 2001 (ar: إسعاف 55) - Ambulance 55; Maree
 Limby, El - 2002 (ar: اللمبى); El-Limby
 Elly Baly Balak - 2003 (ar: اللي بالي بالك) - You-know-who; El-Limby / Riyad Al-Manfaluti
 Oukal - 2004 (ar: عوكل); Oukal / Atata
 Bouha - 2005 (ar: بوحة); Bouha Al-Sabah
 Katkout - 2006 (ar: كتكوت); Katkout Abu Al-Layl / Youssef Khoury
 Karkar - 2007 (ar: كركر); Al-Hinnawi / Karkar / Rida (The son) / Rida (The daughter)
 Boshkash - 2008 (ar: بوشكاش); Boshkash Mahfouz
 Limby 8 Giga, El - 2011 (ar: اللمبى 8 جيجا); El-Limby Fathallah Aish
 Tak Tak Boom - 2011 (ar: تك تك بوم); Tika / Riyad Al-Manfaluti
 Tatah - 2013 (ar: تتح); Tatah
 Hayati Mubhdila - 2015 (ar: حياتي مبهدلة) - My life is wasted; Tatah Abdel-Hafez
 Taht Al Tarabiza - 2016 (ar: تحت الترابيزة) - Under the table; Asim Sinjari / Hanko Abdul-Rahman
 Kinz, Al - 2017 (ar: الكنز) - The treasure; Bishr Katatni
 Mohamed Hussein - 2019 (ar: محمد حسين); Mohamed Hussein
 Kinz 2, Al - 2019 (ar: 2 الكنز) - The treasure 2; Bishr Katatni

Awards 
 The Egyptian Cinema Oscar Award in 2002 for his movie El-Limby.
 ART Award for Best Comedy Cenematic Actor in 2005 for his film Bouha.
 Dear Guest Award for Best Comedy Actor in 2014 for his series Viva Atata.
 Film Association Award for Best Actor in 2017 for his movie Al-Kinz.
 Film Critics Award for the movie Al-Kinz.
 Dear Guest Award for Best Actor for his movie Al-Kinz 2.
 Film Association Award for Best Actor in 2019 for the movie Al-Kinz 2.
 A shield of honor from Youm7, for all his cinematic, dramatic, and theatrical works.

References

Mohamed Saad Movies
Mohamed Saad at AllMovie

1968 births
Living people
People from Giza
People from Giza Governorate
People from Minya Governorate
Egyptian comedians
Egyptian Muslims
Egyptian male film actors
Egyptian male television actors
Egyptian male stage actors
21st-century Egyptian male actors
20th-century Egyptian male actors